Caldera is a port city and commune in the Copiapó Province of  the Atacama Region in northern Chile. It has a harbor protected by breakwaters, being the port city for the productive mining district centering on Copiapó to which it is connected by the first railroad constructed in Chile.

Geography and climate

The climate is mostly warm and extremely dry, because of its location on the Atacama desert's coast, but the temperatures are moderated by the cooling sea currents. However, lately the climate has become colder due to the climatic change.

History

In 1840, William Wheelwright of the Pacific Steam Navigation Company visited the region of Caldera. On his proposal the first railway was created in the year of 1851 from Caldera to Copiapó. Its inauguration was on Christmas Day in 1851. Caldera became an important port for the exportation of minerals. The city itself was officially founded on 23 September 1850.

The city has been struck by earthquakes and tsunamis several times, the major ones being that of 1868, 1877 and 1922. During the 1891 Chilean Civil War, Caldera Bay outside the city became the site of the Battle of Caldera Bay where torpedo boats loyal to Manuel Balmaceda sunk the rebel ironclad Blanco Encalada.

Demographics
In 1903, 2,130 people lived in Caldera. According to the 2002 census of the National Statistics Institute, Caldera had 13,734 inhabitants (7,237 men and 6,497 women). Of these, 13,540 (98.6%) lived in urban areas and 194 (1.4%) in rural areas. The population grew by 13.9% (1,673 persons) between the 1992 and 2002 censuses.

Tourist attractions

Urban
 Former Railway Station: The first in Chile, its construction dates back to 1850, with the beginnings of the works for the railway Caldera–Copiapó, the first railway station in Chile and the third one in South America. It was designed to house a complete train in order to protect valuable minerals brought from Chañarcillo. The walls were made of mud and reeds from Guayaquil, with a wooden roof made of Oregon Pine. Inside it had a passenger platform and three load lines, all covered by a large shed 82 meters long by 32 meters wide.
 Church of San Vicente de Paul: Built in 1862 in wood with a stone floor and a Gothic wooden tower. Inside there is an image of the Virgin of Sorrows, brought from Peru as spoils of war after the military campaigns during the War of the Pacific.
 Cave of Padre Negro: A pilgrimage center built on a rock by the Colombian priest Crisógono Sierra, known locally as Padre Negro (Spanish for "Black Father"). Inside there are murals by the painter Luis Enrique Cerda.
 Municipal Cemetery of Caldera: The first secular cemetery in Chile, it was inaugurated on 20 September 1876. In its historical sector, mausoleums and tombs have cast iron structures made by English craftsmen and Carrara marble tombstones.
 Tornini House Museum: a private museum, opened on 5 November 2010. It houses historical artifacts relating to the city-port of Caldera, the Constitutional Revolution (1859), the War of the Pacific (1879-1883), and the Italian immigration in the late nineteenth century.  The property was built around 1875 by the Railway Administration Manager, Thomas Smith, and later purchased by Henry B. Beazley, British Consul to Copiapó, Caldera and Peru. On 14 October 1907 it was acquired by Bernardo Tornini Capelli, serving for some years as viceconsular seat of the Kingdom of Italy.

Rural

 Orbicular Granite Nature Sanctuary: This geological oddity is located 11 km North of Caldera. It is a formation of a small area, about 400 m², with circular rock mineral scales on granite rocks, giving a peculiar appearance. Given the unusual nature the rock formation, it was declared a nature sanctuary in 1981 and is protected by conservation laws that apply to this type of landmark.
 Bahía Inglesa: A resort located a short distance from Caldera (6 km), with its name meaning "English Bay". With a population of 135 inhabitants (2002 census), it is named for the visit made by the English pirate Edward Davis. It is known particularly for its white sands and warm waters, in addition to good infrastructure for receiving both domestic and foreign visitors. There are camping facilities, hotels, restaurants and summer houses that can be rented on the spot. In the bay is an underwater museum.
 Playa La Virgen: A beach located 35 km south of Bahía Inglesa and 68 km west of Copiapó, which due to its white sand and warm waters has been considered the best beach in Chile for several years. Its name, meaning "Virgin Beach", is because on a road to the beach there is a rock which resembles the Virgin Mary. This beach has facilities for camping, parking, and has restaurants nearby.

Economy
Mainstays of the economy are copper ore mining and cultivation of citrus plants which are exported from the port. Fishing and tourism also play an important role. The beaches attract many visitors.

Administration
As a commune, Caldera is a third-level administrative division of Chile administered by a municipal council, headed by an alcalde (mayor) who is directly elected every four years. Since 2016 mayor is Brunilda González (PPD).

Within the electoral divisions of Chile, Caldera is represented in the Chamber of Deputies by Mr. Alberto Robles (PRSD) and Mrs. Yasna Provoste (DC) as part of the 6th electoral district, (together with Tierra Amarilla, Vallenar, Freirina, Huasco and Alto del Carmen). The commune is represented in the Senate by Isabel Allende Bussi (PS) and Baldo Prokurica Prokurica (RN) as part of the 3rd senatorial constituency (Atacama Region).

Gallery

Sister cities 
 Lules, Argentina
 Villa Unión, Argentina
 General Lamadrid, Argentina

References

External links

  Municipality of Caldera

Communes of Chile
Port cities in Chile
Populated places established in 1850
Populated places in Copiapó Province
Coasts of Atacama Region